The flora of Qatar includes more than 300 species of wild plants. 
Qatar occupies a small desert peninsula that is around 80 km (50 miles) from east to west and 160 km (100 miles) from north to south. The climate is hot and humid with sporadic rain. Majority of the country is flat with an annual rainfall average of less than 3 inches. Arnebia hispidissim blooms yellow flowers annually in sandy soil. Glossonema edule has edible fruits with brownish-yellow flowers.

Vegetation is extremely sparse in the hamada landscape due to the heavily weathered soil. A native species of tree, Vachellia tortilis (known locally as samr) is well adapted to the desert environment and one of the most common forms of vegetation in the country. Tetraena qatarensis and Lycium shawii also grow in this landscape.

Shallow depressions referred to as rawdat constitute a more varied selection of plants since rainwater run-off is more likely to accumulate. Ziziphus nummularia favors deeper soil in this type of habitat, whereas the grass Cymbopogon parkeri is found in shallower soils. In the south of the peninsula, where groundwater is scarce, Panicum turgidum and V. tortilis grow in the wind-blown soils. Vegetative distribution in the south is mostly concentrated in rawdas and in wadis fed by run-off from nearby hills.

Natural areas

Natural areas in Qatar include:
 Al Shahaniyah Park in Al-Shahaniya
 Al Wabra Wildlife Preservation 	 
 Khor Al Udeid Fish Sanctuary	
 Al Reem Biosphere Preserve (designated in 2007) is part of the World Network of Biosphere Reserves in the Arab States	 
 Ras Ushairij Gazelle Conservation Park	
 Al Thakira Nature Reserve in Al Thakhira
 Khor Al Adaid in Khor Al Adaid
 Ras Abrouq Nature Reserve (also known as Bir Zekreet (Zekreet Beach) in Ras Abrouq
 Umm Tais National Park

Taxonomy

Class: Psilotopsida

Order: Ophioglossales
Family: Ophioglossaceae
Genus: Ophioglossum
Ophioglossum polyphyllum (native)

Class: Magnoliopsida

Order: Asterales
Family: Asteraceae
Genus: Reichardia

Order: Caryophyllales
Family: Amaranthaceae
Genus: Suaeda
Suaeda aegyptiaca 
Genus: Salsola
Salsola rosmarinus
Family: Caryophyllaceae
Genus: Silene
Silene Arabica (native)
Family: Polygonaceae
Genus: Calligonum
Calligonum comosum (native)

Order: Malpighiales

Family: Euphorbiaceae
Genus: Mercurialis
Mercurialis annua (introduced)

Order: Fabales
Family: Fabaceae
Genus: Taverniera
Taverniera spartea (native)
Genus: Senna
Senna occidentalis (introduced)

Order: Zygophyllales
Family: Zygophyllaceae
Genus: Tetraena
Tetraena qatarensis (native)

See also
 Fauna of Qatar
 Wildlife of Qatar

References

External links
Enature.qa - Encyclopedia of all flora in Qatar
Book of Trees in Qatar by the Ministry of Municipality and Environment 

 
.Qatar
.Qatar